Diva Grabovčeva (born in Rumboci (Prozor-Rama) – died c. 1680, Kedžara) was a Bosnian Roman Catholic virgin martyr.

Biography
According to the legend, she was born in the village of Rumboci in northern Herzegovina. She refused an Ottoman nobleman's marriage proposal, ran away from her home and hid in the Kedžara area. The young man found her and tried to rape her. She was fighting and he killed her. At the beginning of 20th century the archaeologist Ćiro Truhelka found mortal remains of a young girl in a grave associated with the legend and claimed that it was Diva Grabovčeva.

She is a symbol of virginity. Croatian singer-songwriter Marko Perković recorded "Diva Grabovčeva", dedicated to her. The author of her monument (statue) is the well known sculptor Kuzma Kovačić.

See also

References

People from Prozor-Rama
Croats of Bosnia and Herzegovina
Bosnia and Herzegovina Roman Catholics
17th-century Christian martyrs
17th-century Croatian people
Catholic martyrs
Bosnia and Herzegovina murder victims
People murdered in Bosnia and Herzegovina